Triallam timcheall na Fodla ("Let us wander around Ireland") is medieval Irish topographical text.

Overview

Composed by Seán Mór Ó Dubhagáin, Triallam  consists of twenty verses divided into four (but sometimes five or even six) lines. The full poem is nine hundred and sixteen lines in length. It identifies various tribes, dynasties and territories of the Gaelic-Irish, as they were immediately before the arrival of the Anglo-Normans. Ó Dubhagáin devotes one hundred and fifty-two lines to Meath, three hundred and fifty-four to Ulster, three hundred and twenty-eight to Connacht, and fifty-six to Leinster. Possibly the work was unfinished at the time of Ó Dubhagáin's death in 1372; sometime after Ó Dubhagáin's death, Giolla na Naomh Ó hUidhrín (d. 1420) completed the poem.

See also

 Críchad an Chaoilli
 Crichaireacht cinedach nduchasa Muintiri Murchada
 Tuilleadh feasa ar Éirinn óigh
 Giolla na Naomh Ó hUidhrín
 Leabhar Adhamh Ó Cianáin

References
 Topographical Poems by Seaán Mór Ó Dubhagáin and Giolla-Na-Naomh Ó Huidhrín, ed. James Carney, Dublin Institute for Advanced Studies, 1943.

External links

Irish texts
Irish manuscripts
Irish-language literature
Medieval manuscripts
Medieval genealogies and succession lists
Irish books